Paul "Buddy" Swan (October 24, 1929 – March 21, 1993) (also credited as Buddy Swann) was an American child actor, best known for playing the title character of the 1941 film Citizen Kane as an eight-year-old boy.

He also appeared in the horror film The Ape, the horror comedy Scared Stiff, and the Academy-Award nominated film The Fighting Sullivans, playing one of the Sullivan brothers in their youth.

Swan also appeared as a young actor in Broadway plays in 1942, including Mr. Sycamore.

Filmography

References

External links

Buddy Swan filmography

1929 births
1993 deaths
American male child actors
20th-century American male actors